Benjamin Thomas Hamilton (born August 18, 1977) is a former American college and professional football player who was a guard and center in the National Football League (NFL) for ten seasons.  He played college football for the University of Minnesota, and was a two-time consensus All-American.  The Denver Broncos picked him in the fourth round of the 2001 NFL Draft, and he played professionally for the Broncos and Seattle Seahawks of the NFL.

Early years
Hamilton was born in Minneapolis, Minnesota, the son of former Minnesota Vikings offensive lineman Wes Hamilton. He attended Wayzata High School in Plymouth, Minnesota, and was all-state selection in football. He graduated in 1996.

College career
He attended the University of Minnesota, where he played for the Minnesota Golden Gophers football team from 1996 to 2000.  He was a two-time first-team All-Big Ten selection, and was recognized as a consensus first-team All-American in 1999 and 2000.

Professional career
He was drafted by the Denver Broncos in the fourth round of the 2001 NFL Draft.  After playing his entire career with the Broncos, Hamilton signed with the Seattle Seahawks on April 20, 2010.

On November 2, 2010, Hamilton was placed on injured reserve. On December 22, Hamilton was waived from the injury list.

Post NFL career
Hamilton is currently a full-time mathematics teacher at Valor Christian High School in Highlands Ranch, CO.

References

1977 births
Living people
All-American college football players
American football centers
American football offensive guards
Berlin Thunder players
Denver Broncos players
Minnesota Golden Gophers football players
Players of American football from Minneapolis
Seattle Seahawks players